Sutukoba, sometimes referred to as Sutuko, is a village in The Gambia located in the Upper River Region, 332 km east of the capital Banjul and 38 km northeast of the regional capital Basse Santa Su. The population in 2013 was 3317.

Climate
The surroundings of Sutukoba are a mosaic of farmland and natural vegetation. Average annual temperature is 26 °C . The warmest month is April, when the average temperature is 33 °C, and the coldest is August, with 22 °C. Average annual rainfall is 984 millimeters. The wettest month is September, with an average of 321 mm of rainfall, and the driest is February, with 1 mm of rainfall.

History
At the beginning of the 15th century, Sutukoba was an important trading town within the Kingdom of Wuli, a client state of the Jolof Empire. The town had an estimated 4000 inhabitants at that time. From the early 17th to the 19th century, Portuguese and other Europeans came upriver to exchange manufactures, cloth, leather, ivory, slaves, gold and other goods in Sutukoba (also called Setuko, Sotico, Settiko, or Selico in sources of the time) and the nearby river port of Fattatenda with the local jula merchants. Sutukoba hosts an annual Kankiling Festival to celebrate and preserve the community's history and culture.

People
Sidia Jatta, chairperson and founder of the People's Democratic Organization for Independence and Socialism
Musa Yaffa, international football player

See also
 List of villages in The Gambia

References 

Populated places in the Gambia
Upper River Division